Eino Olavi Kuronen (22 January 1923 in Maaninka – 8 January 1989) was a Finnish ski jumper who competed in the 1950s. He finished tied for 12th in the individual large hill event at the 1952 Winter Olympics in Oslo.

External links
1924-56 Winter Olympic ski jumping results

1923 births
1989 deaths
People from Maaninka
Olympic ski jumpers of Finland
Ski jumpers at the 1952 Winter Olympics
Finnish male ski jumpers
Sportspeople from North Savo
20th-century Finnish people